The Bettmerhorn is a mountain of the Bernese Alps, located north of Bettmeralp in the Swiss canton of Valais. The summit can be reached with a 30-minute vertical hike after ascending most of the mountain by cable car from the car free village of Bettmeralp. Bettmeralp is accessible by cable car from the Betten train station (Matterhorn Gotthard Bahn).

The Bettmerhorn summit station offers impressive views on the Bernese Alps and the Aletsch Glacier, the largest in the Alps. The view also extends to the Lepontine and Pennine Alps (Dom, Matterhorn, Weisshorn).

References

External links 
Bettmerhorn cable car

Mountains of Valais
Mountains of the Alps
Tourist attractions in Switzerland
Cable cars in Switzerland
Bernese Alps
Mountains of Switzerland
Two-thousanders of Switzerland